Ruggero Raimondi (born 3 October 1941) is an Italian bass-baritone opera singer who has also appeared in motion pictures.

Life and career

Early training and career
Ruggero Raimondi was born in Bologna, Italy, during World War II. His voice matured early into its adult timbre, and at the age of 15, he auditioned for conductor Francesco Molinari-Pradelli, who encouraged him to pursue an operatic career. He began vocal studies with Ettore Campogalliani, and was accepted at age 16 as a student at the Giuseppe Verdi Conservatory in Milan. He then continued his studies in Rome, under the guidance of Teresa Pediconi and Armando Piervenanzi.

After having won the National Competition for young opera singers in Spoleto, he made his debut in the same city in the role of Colline in La bohème in the Festival dei Due Mondi. Subsequently, an opportunity arose for him at the Teatro dell'Opera in Rome when he was called upon to substitute in the role of Procida in Giuseppe Verdi's I vespri siciliani, and he received enormous success from the public and the critics. The young singer was very shy and stiff at first, but his early directors helped him, and he was soon an accomplished opera actor.

Opera, film and television
Raimondi's career soon extended to the major opera houses in Italy, such as La Fenice in Venice, the Teatro Regio in Turin, Teatro Comunale in Florence and abroad, beginning with the Glyndebourne Festival (Don Giovanni in 1969). His La Scala debut was as Timur in Turandot in 1968, his Metropolitan Opera debut was as Silva in Ernani in 1970, and his Covent Garden debut was as Fiesco in Simon Boccanegra in 1972. In 1975, he made his Paris Opera debut as Procida, followed by the title role in Boris Godunov, and his Salzburg Festival debut in 1980 as the King in Aida. In 1986, he first directed a production of Don Giovanni, and decided to continue his career as a director as well.

Raimondi is especially well-known for his Rossini and Mozart roles, although he has also sung a lot of other bass roles in various repertories. Some of his most important roles have been King Philip in Verdi's Don Carlos; Fiesco; the title roles in Boris Godunov (including the Andrzej Żuławski film) and Attila; Silva; Escamillo in Bizet's Carmen (including the Francesco Rosi film, 1984, with Plácido Domingo and Julia Migenes); the title role in Don Giovanni (including the Joseph Losey film, 1979); Count Almaviva in The Marriage of Figaro; and Don Alfonso in Così fan tutte; the title role in Don Quichotte by Massenet; and Scarpia in a recording of Tosca later filmed live from Rome, with Plácido Domingo and Catherine Malfitano, conducted by Zubin Mehta. He also made the television film Six Characters in Search of a Singer. In 2008, Raimondi made his television debut in the mini-series Le Sanglot des anges on French TV, in which he played the role of an Italian opera singer. In July 2011 he played the role of Pagano in Verdi's I Lombardi alla prima crociata on the rooftop of Milan Cathedral. The concert was organized by the Veneranda Fabbrica del Duomo di Milano to celebrate the 150th anniversary of Italian unification.

Recordings

Audio recordings
Mozart: Don Giovanni | Sony | 1978
Mozart: Le nozze di Figaro | Decca | 1985
Mussorgsky: Boris Godunov | Erato | 1989
Puccini: Turandot | Deutsche Grammophon | 1981
Puccini: Tosca | Deutsche Grammophon | 1979
Rossini: Il barbiere di Siviglia | Deutsche Grammophon | 1993
Rossini: Il barbiere di Siviglia | EMI | 1973–74
Rossini: Il barbiere di Siviglia (w/bonus DVD) DVD | Decca | 1993
Rossini: Il viaggio a Reims | Deutsche Grammophon | 1984
Rossini: La Cenerentola| Decca | 1987
Rossini: L'italiana in Algeri | Deutsche Grammophon | 1989
Verdi: Aida | Deutsche Grammophon | 1981
Verdi: I vespri siciliani | RCA Red Seal | 1973
Verdi: Attila | Philips | 1972
Verdi: Don Carlos | Deutsche Grammophon | 1985
Verdi: Un ballo in maschera | Deutsche Grammophon | 1980
Verdi: I masnadieri | Phillips | 1975

TV
2008 : Le Sanglot des Anges, mini series directed by Jacques Otmezguine
2005 : Così fan tutte staged by Patrice Chéreau
2001 : Il turco in Italia with Cecilia Bartoli at Zürich Opera House
1992 : Glyndebourne Festival Opera: A Gala Evening, directed by Christopher Swann
1992 : Tosca: in the settings and at the times of Tosca, directed by Brian Large (with Malfitano and Domingo)
1992 : Le nozze di Figaro, directed by Brian Large
1991 : José Carreras and Friends: Opera Recital
1985 : Faust staged by Ken Russell at the Vienna State Opera
1983 : The Metropolitan Opera Centennial Gala Directed by Kirk Browning
1983 : Ernani Directed by Kirk Browning (with Milnes and Pavarotti)
1982 : Verdi's Messa da Requiem
1981 : Six personnages en quête d'un chanteur by Maurice Béjart
1980 : Boris Godunov staged by Joseph Losey at Opéra National de Paris

Filmography
2019 : Beaux-parents by Héctor Cabello Reyes
2001 : Tosca by Benoît Jacquot, with Angela Gheorghiu & Roberto Alagna
1997 :  by Alain Jessua
1989 : Boris Godunov by Andrzej Żuławski
1984 : Carmen by Francesco Rosi, with Plácido Domingo
1983 : La vie est un roman by Alain Resnais
1982 : La Truite by Joseph Losey
1979 : Don Giovanni by Joseph Losey, with José van Dam, Kiri Te Kanawa

Honours 
 Monaco: Commander of the Order of Cultural Merit (November 1999)

See also
 Debussy: Pelléas et Mélisande (Herbert von Karajan recording)

References

Further reading

External links
Raimondi website

Interview with Ruggero Raimondi, November 16, 1987

1941 births
Living people
Operatic bass-baritones
Grammy Award winners
Musicians from Bologna
Italian theatre directors
Commanders of the Order of Cultural Merit (Monaco)
20th-century Italian male opera singers
21st-century Italian male opera singers